James N. Stewart is a retired American military officer and civil servant. Confirmed as Assistant Secretary of Defense for Manpower and Reserve Affairs in the administration of Donald Trump, he served throughout his tenure as acting Under Secretary of Defense for Personnel and Readiness, before resigning the following year.

Early life and education
Stewart was born the son of a retired Air Force lieutenant colonel and Vietnam War veteran, and, from a young age, he desired to follow in his father's footsteps. He graduated with a bachelor's degree in sociology and criminology from Auburn University, where he was also a member of the school's Air Force Reserve Officer Training Corps.

Air Force service

Stewart was commissioned as a second lieutenant in 1977 and left active duty in 1992. He continued his military career as a member of the Air Force Reserve Command until 2014.

His decorations include the Air Force Distinguished Service Medal, Legion of Merit, Airman's Medal, and Meritorious Service Medal.

Civilian career
Following his retirement from the Air Force Reserve, Stewart moved to Charlotte, North Carolina. He was appointed to the North Carolina Military Affairs Commission by Governor Pat McCrory in 2015.

President Donald Trump tapped Stewart to be Assistant Secretary of Defense for Manpower and Reserve Affairs in January 2018 and was confirmed by the Senate on October 11. After serving in this position and as acting Under Secretary of Defense for Personnel and Readiness until December 2019, he submitted his resignation to Secretary Mark Esper.

Dates of rank

Decorations

References

External links

 Air Force biography
 Department of Defense biography

Living people
Auburn University alumni
Central Michigan University alumni
National War College alumni
Trump administration personnel
United States Air Force officers
United States Air Force reservists
United States Assistant Secretaries of Defense
Year of birth missing (living people)